Loanwords in Classical Syriac Aramaic entered the language throughout different periods in the history of Mesopotamia. The Alexandrian and Seleucid rule along with interaction with their fellow citizens of the Greco-Roman world of the Fertile Crescent resulted in the adoption of numerous Greek words. The majority of these were nouns relating to Roman administration, such as officials, military, and law. The largest group of loanwords come from Greek and is followed by Iranian loans, although words from Sumerian, Akkadian, and Latin are also passed on in varying degrees. Several Hebrew loanwords exist (particularly religious terms). The Islamic Conquests changed the demographics of the empire and resulted in an influx of a new corpus of words from Arabic while life under the Seljuk, Ottoman, and Safavid empires introduced Turkic words to the language.

Language isolates

Sumerian

Semitic

Akkadian

Arabic

Hebrew

Indo-European

Greek
Early Greek loans which were administrative in nature became obscure as society changed, although words adopted from translations of Christian and philosophical texts outlived the former and survive to the current day.

Latin
Latin loans appear to have been largely transmitted to Syriac via Greek. This is evident based on the Syriac orthography which demonstrates it was borrowed from the Greek form.

Iranian

Altaic

Turkic

See also
 List of loanwords in Assyrian Neo-Aramaic

References

Further reading
 

Aramaic languages